Abraham Frumkin (
1873–1940) was a Jewish author, journalist, and anarchist.

References

1872 births
1940 deaths
Anarchist writers
Ashkenazi Jews in Ottoman Palestine
Israeli anarchists
Israeli people of Belarusian-Jewish descent
Istanbul University Faculty of Law alumni
Jewish anarchists
Writers from Istanbul
Writers from Jerusalem
People from London
People from New York City
Printers
Yiddish-language writers